Pfeiffer Zara Georgi (born 27 September 2000) is an English professional racing cyclist, who currently rides for UCI Women's WorldTeam . She won the 2021 British National Road Race Championships.

In 2017 she won the Gent–Wevelgem junior race and came second overall in the EPZ Omloop van Borsele. In 2018, she won the junior races Trofeo Da Moreno (junior race of Trofeo Alfredo Binda), Healthy Ageing Tour, and Watersley Ladies Challenge. In September 2021, she took her first professional win at La Choralis Fourmies Feminine in France, and the following month Georgi won the women's road race in the National Road Championships. She competed in the 2021 UCI Road World Championships, where she worked as a domestique in the road race with responsibility for leading Lizzie Deignan into the course's climbs, earning praise from the latter.

Personal life
Georgi was born in Herne Hill, London before her family moved to the West Country, where she raced on the Castle Combe Circuit, making her debut there at the age of six. Her brother Etienne cycled for Team Wiggins Le Col in 2017–2018. Her father Peter races at Masters level and her mother Louise is an amateur cyclist. In 2020 she broke two vertebrae in a crash in Belgium.

Major results

2017
 1st Gent–Wevelgem Juniors
 2nd Overall EPZ Omloop van Borsele Juniors
1st  Young rider classification
1st  Points classification
 UCI Junior Road World Championships
6th Road race
7th Time trial
 10th Trofeo Alfredo Binda-Comune di Cittiglio Juniors
2018
 1st  Overall Healthy Ageing Tour
1st Stage 2
 1st  Overall Watersley Ladies Challenge
1st Stage 1
 1st Trofeo Alfredo Binda-Comune di Cittiglio Juniors
 2nd Overall EPZ Omloop van Borsele Juniors
 4th Time trial, UCI Junior Road World Championships
2019
 3rd Time trial, National Under-23 Road Championships
 8th Road race, UEC European Under-23 Road Championships
2021
 1st  Road race, National Road Championships
 1st La Choralis Fourmies
 5th GP Eco-Struct
 6th Ronde van Drenthe
 8th Overall The Women's Tour
2022
 1st  Time trial, National Under-23 Road Championships
 2nd  Elimination race, UEC European Track Championships
 2nd  Road race, UCI Road World Under-23 Championships
 2nd Road race, National Road Championships
 4th Dwars door Vlaanderen
 9th Omloop van het Hageland
 9th Paris–Roubaix
2023
 9th Strade Bianche

References

External links
 

2000 births
Living people
English female cyclists
Sportspeople from Somerset